The Office is an American television sitcom developed by Greg Daniels and based on the British series of the same name created by Ricky Gervais and Stephen Merchant. The show premiered on NBC on March 24, 2005, and concluded on May 16, 2013, after airing 201 episodes across nine seasons. Filmed as a mockumentary, the series depicts the everyday lives of a group of office employees in the Scranton, Pennsylvania, branch of the fictional Dunder Mifflin Paper Company. The Office initially featured Steve Carell as Michael Scott, Rainn Wilson as Dwight Schrute, John Krasinski as Jim Halpert, Jenna Fischer as Pam Beesly, and B. J. Novak as Ryan Howard; the show's cast changed significantly during its run.

Despite premiering to mixed reviews during its first season, The Offices subsequent seasons received widespread acclaim and became a success for NBC, though later seasons were criticized for a dip in quality. From 2006 to 2011, the show was nominated six consecutive times for the Primetime Emmy Award for Outstanding Comedy Series, winning for its second season. The show was also nominated for three Golden Globe Awards for Best Television Series – Musical or Comedy; five Producers Guild of America Awards for Best Episodic Comedy, winning once; the 2006 TCA Award for Program of the Year; and four TCA Awards for Outstanding Achievement in Comedy, winning twice. The Office was named as one of the top television programs of 2006 and 2008 by the American Film Institute, and in 2007, the series was recognized with a Peabody Award.

The performances of many of the show's actors were recognized. Carell was nominated six times for the Primetime Emmy Award for Outstanding Lead Actor in a Comedy Series but never won, which has been frequently called one of the biggest snubs in Emmys history. Carell also received a Golden Globe Award, a TCA Award, and six Screen Actors Guild Award nominations for his performance. Wilson was nominated for three Primetime Emmy Awards for Outstanding Supporting Actor in a Comedy Series, and Fischer was nominated once for Outstanding Supporting Actress in a Comedy Series. As a whole, the cast was nominated seven times for the Screen Actors Guild Award for Outstanding Performance by an Ensemble in a Comedy Series, winning in 2007 and 2008.

The Offices writing and directing also received numerous accolades. The series won two Writers Guild of America Awards for Television: Episodic Comedy for "Casino Night", written by Carell, and "The Job", written by Paul Lieberstein and Michael Schur. In addition, the show's writing staff was recognized with the Writers Guild of America Award for Television: Comedy Series in 2007, and Daniels won the Primetime Emmy Award for Outstanding Writing for a Comedy Series for the episode "Gay Witch Hunt". Paul Feig received a Directors Guild of America Award for his work on "Dinner Party", while Jeffrey Blitz won the Primetime Emmy Award for Outstanding Directing for a Comedy Series for "Stress Relief".

Awards and nominations

Notes

Nominees for awards

Other

References

External links 

The Office (American TV series)
Lists of awards by television series
NBCUniversal-related lists